César Andres Villarraga (born September 22, 1985) is a Colombian professional boxer. As an amateur, he won a gold medal at the 2010 South American Games and qualified for the 2012 Olympics.

At the 2010 South American Games he made good use of home advantage to beat Hector Manzanilla and Eric Bandega before defeating the future World Champion Everton Lopes. He has yet to repeat that success. At the 2010 Central American and Caribbean Games he won silver.

At the 2011 Pan American Games he lost his very first bout against Angel Suarez. At the 2011 World Amateur Boxing Championships he again lost in the first round to Javkhlan Bariadi.

At the Olympic qualifier he won two fights to qualify, then lost to Roniel Iglesias at the 2012 Olympics.

References

External links
 

Lightweight boxers
Boxers at the 2011 Pan American Games
Pan American Games competitors for Colombia
Boxers at the 2012 Summer Olympics
Olympic boxers of Colombia
1985 births
Living people
Colombian male boxers
South American Games gold medalists for Colombia
South American Games medalists in boxing
Competitors at the 2010 South American Games
Central American and Caribbean Games silver medalists for Colombia
Central American and Caribbean Games medalists in boxing
Competitors at the 2010 Central American and Caribbean Games
Sportspeople from Bogotá
21st-century Colombian people